The 2014 Dayton Flyers football team represented the University of Dayton in the 2014 NCAA Division I FCS football season. They were led by seventh-year head coach Rick Chamberlin and played their home games at Welcome Stadium. They were a member of the Pioneer Football League. They finished the season 8–3, 6–2 in PFL play to finish in a tie for third place.

Schedule

Source: Schedule

References

Dayton
Dayton Flyers football seasons
Dayton Flyers football